Anderton with Marbury is a civil parish in Cheshire West and Chester, England, which contains the villages of Anderton and Marbury. The Trent and Mersey Canal runs through the parish. Also in the parish is the Anderton Boat Lift, a scheduled monument, which has been restored to carry boats from the canal down to the Weaver Navigation. In the parish are four buildings that are recorded in the National Heritage List for England as designated listed buildings, all of which are at Grade II. This grade is the lowest of the three gradings given to listed buildings and is applied to "buildings of national importance and special interest". The structures consist of a mill and the miller's house, a farmhouse, and a milepost on the canal.

See also
Listed buildings in Barnton
Listed buildings in Comberbach
Listed buildings in Great Budworth
Listed buildings in Marston
Listed buildings in Northwich
Listed buildings in Wincham

References
Citations

Sources

Listed buildings in Cheshire West and Chester
Lists of listed buildings in Cheshire